Budhanath temple situated on the bank of river Ganga, has statues dating 1937. It is located at Jogsar, adampur, Bhagalpur, Bihar, India.

How to reach

Budhanath mandir is 1.6 km from bhagalpur junction. You can reach bhagalpur junction via train.

From bhagalpur junction you can reach budhanath mandir via khalifabagh market road and burhanath road.

External link
 According to the Shivapurana, Baba Bal Vridheshwarnath or Budhanath is one of the 108 Nath in India. 
Article http://www.shivshankar.in/budhanath-mandir-bhagalpur-bihar/

Hindu temples in Bihar
Bhagalpur